Nazım Sangaré (born 30 May 1994) is a Turkish professional footballer who plays as a right-back for Fenerbahçe.

International career
Sangaré was born in Germany to a Turkish mother from Eskişehir and a father from Guinea. He was called up to the Turkish national team on 24 May 2019. He made his debut on 30 May 2019, in a friendly against Greece, as a starter.

Career statistics

Club

International

References

External links
 
 
 

Living people
1994 births
Footballers from Cologne
Association football defenders
Turkish footballers
Turkish people of Guinean descent
German footballers
German people of Turkish descent
German people of Guinean descent
German sportspeople of African descent
Citizens of Turkey through descent
Alemannia Aachen players
Fortuna Düsseldorf II players
VfL Osnabrück players
3. Liga players
Süper Lig players
Antalyaspor footballers
Fenerbahçe S.K. footballers
Turkey international footballers